Edi Carlo Dias Marçal also known as Andradina (born September 13, 1974)  is a retired Brazilian footballer (striker). Currently he is coach of Pogoń Szczecin II.

Career
In May 2011, he returned to Pogoń Szczecin on a two-year contract.

Club statistics

Honours
 Russian First Division top scorer: 1998 (27 goals)

References

External links
 

1974 births
Living people
Brazilian footballers
Brazilian expatriate footballers
J1 League players
J2 League players
Ekstraklasa players
Gamba Osaka players
Oita Trinita players
Albirex Niigata players
Hokkaido Consadole Sapporo players
Expatriate footballers in Japan
Pogoń Szczecin players
Korona Kielce players
Santos FC players
Associação Atlética Portuguesa (Santos) players
Esporte Clube Santo André players
Expatriate footballers in Russia
Association football forwards
Expatriate footballers in Poland
Brazilian expatriate sportspeople in Poland
FC Arsenal Tula players
People from Andradina